Yavuz Selim is one of the neighbourhoods in Etimesgut town of Ankara, Turkey. It is between Güzelkent and Fatih Mahallesi.

The district is about 30 km to the Ankara city centre, and 60 km to the Esenboğa International Airport.

Yavuz Selim District Photos

Neighbourhoods of Etimesgut